Edward Vincent McNeill (26 March 1929 – April 1979) was an English professional footballer who played as a goalkeeper for Sunderland.

He died in April 1979 at the age of 50.

References

1929 births
1979 deaths
Association footballers from Northern Ireland
Association football goalkeepers
Dundalk F.C. players
English Football League players
People from Warrenpoint
Portadown F.C. players
Sunderland A.F.C. players